Clarence "Gatemouth" Brown (April 18, 1924 – September 10, 2005) was an American singer and multi-instrumentalist from Louisiana. He won a Grammy Award for Best Traditional Blues Album in 1983 for his album, Alright Again!.

Early life
Brown was born in Vinton, Louisiana, and raised near Orange, Texas. His father was a railroad worker and local musician who taught him several musical instruments, including fiddle by age 5; as well as piano and guitar. He had at least one brother.

Career
Brown was performing guitar by age ten. He also played drums in swing bands as a teenager.

1940s and 1950s
Brown served in the military during World War II. His professional music career began in 1945, playing drums in San Antonio, Texas. He was given the nickname "Gatemouth" by a high school teacher who said he had a "voice like a gate". His career was boosted when he attended a concert by T-Bone Walker in Don Robey's Bronze Peacock Houston nightclub in 1947; Walker became ill, and Brown took up his guitar and quickly wrote and played "Gatemouth Boogie", to the delight of the audience.

In 1949 Robey founded Peacock Records in order to showcase Brown's virtuoso guitar work. Brown's "Mary Is Fine" backed with "My Time Is Expensive" was a hit for Peacock in 1949. A string of Peacock releases in the 1950s were less successful commercially, but were nonetheless pioneering musically. Particularly notable was the 1954 instrumental "Okie Dokie Stomp", in which Brown solos continuously over a punchy horn section (other instrumentals from this period include "Boogie Uproar" and "Gate Walks to Board"). "Okie Dokie Stomp" was also recorded by Cornell Dupree in the 1970s, who also had a commercial success with it. As for his gutsy violin playing, Robey allowed Brown to record "Just Before Dawn", his final release on the Peacock label, in 1959.

1960s and 1970s
In the 1960s Brown moved to Nashville, Tennessee, to participate in a syndicated R&B television show, and while he was there recorded several country singles. He struck up a friendship with Roy Clark and made several appearances on the television show Hee Haw. In 1966, Brown was the musical director for the house band on the short-lived television program, The !!!! Beat. Later in the decade, he worked as a deputy sheriff in New Mexico.

However, in the early 1970s several countries in Europe had developed an appreciation for American roots music, especially the blues, and Brown was a popular and well-respected artist there. He toured Europe twelve times, beginning in 1971 and continuing throughout the 1970s. He also became an official ambassador for American music, and participated in several tours sponsored by the U.S. State Department, including an extensive tour of Eastern Africa. Brown appeared at the 1973 Montreux Jazz Festival, where he jammed with American blues rock band Canned Heat, playing guitar and harmonica. In 1974, he recorded as a sideman with the New Orleans pianist Professor Longhair on his album, Rock 'N' Roll Gumbo (originally a Blue Star Records release). He moved to New Orleans in the late 1970s. In 1979, through his manager at the time, Jim Halsey, Brown embarked on a 6-week, 44 concert tour of the Soviet Union. This was an historic event as it marked the first time the Soviet Union made a contract with a U.S. private citizen (Jim Halsey) as regards a musical tour. All previous tours were under the auspices of the U.S. State Department. This was by far the most extensive tour an American band had taken in the USSR.

Later years
In the 1980s, a series of releases on Rounder Records and Alligator Records revitalized his U.S. career, and he toured extensively and internationally, usually playing between 250 and 300 shows a year. He won a Grammy in 1982 for the album Alright Again! and was nominated for five more. Alright Again! is credited with putting Brown back on the musical map. He also won eight W. C. Handy Awards.

In 1999, Brown was inducted into the Blues Hall of Fame.

In his last years, he maintained a full touring schedule, including Australia, New Zealand, South America, Africa and Eastern Europe. His final record Timeless was released in 2004.

Personal life

Brown was married and divorced three times. He had four children: three daughters, Ursula Brown of Houston, Celeste Biles of Vista, California, and Renée Brown of New Orleans, and a son, Dwayne Brown, of Oklahoma City.

Brown smoked a pipe. In September 2004, Brown was diagnosed with lung cancer. He already had emphysema and heart disease, and he and his doctors decided to forego treatment for the cancer. His home in Slidell, Louisiana, was destroyed by Hurricane Katrina in August 2005, although he had been evacuated to his childhood hometown of Orange, Texas, and lived with his brother before the storm hit.

He died in Orange on September 10, 2005, at the apartment of a grandniece, at the age of 81. Brown is buried in the Hollywood Cemetery in Orange. Flooding caused by Hurricane Ike in September 2008 damaged his grave. His grave has since been refurbished and through the estate funds, a headstone has been erected in his honor. A marker honoring Brown was placed by the Texas Historical Commission next to the flagpole at Hollywood Cemetery.

Musical style and influences
Known for his work as a blues musician, Brown spent his career fighting purism by synthesizing traditional blues and country, jazz, Cajun music and rhythm and blues.

Brown was acclaimed for his skills on multiple instruments, including the guitar, mandolin, viola, violin, harmonica and drums. 
He is regarded as one of the most influential exponents of the blues fiddle and has had enormous influence in American fiddle circles.

Brown's biggest musical influences were Louis Jordan, T-Bone Walker, and Count Basie. His highly original electric guitar style influenced many blues and rock guitarists, including Guitar Slim, Albert Collins, and Johnny "Guitar" Watson.

Composer Frank Zappa, in his autobiography, The Real Frank Zappa Book (1989), credited Brown, along with Guitar Slim and Johnny "Guitar" Watson, as important influences on his guitar playing.

Discography

Original albums

Compilations and bootlegs

Other contributions
 1976 Grey's Mood (with Al Grey) rec. 1973–1975 (Black & Blue 33.085; Classic Jazz CJ-118; CD reissue: Black & Blue BB-912.2)
 2003 Johnny's Blues: A Tribute to Johnny Cash (NorthernBlues) Brown sings Johnny Cash's 1956 rockabilly song "Get Rhythm" with Benjy Davis

See also
List of blues musicians
List of fiddlers
List of Gibson players
Music of Texas

References

External links

 W.C. Handy Blues Awards on National Public Radio Talk of the Nation
 'Gatemouth' Brown Plays Through Cancer, Years on National Public Radio All Things Considered
 Remembrances: 'Gatemouth' Brown's Blues Voice Goes Quiet on National Public Radio All Things Considered
 Clarence "Gatemouth" Brown Discography 
 Video Interview with Clarence "Gatemouth" Brown, Loyola University, New Orleans

1924 births
2005 deaths
20th-century African-American male singers
20th-century American guitarists
20th-century American violinists
People from Vinton, Louisiana
African-American country musicians
African-American guitarists
African Americans in World War II
African-American songwriters
Alligator Records artists
American blues drummers
American blues harmonica players
American blues guitarists
American blues mandolinists
American blues violists
American country fiddlers
American country singer-songwriters
American folk musicians
American male guitarists
American male singer-songwriters
American rhythm and blues guitarists
American rhythm and blues singer-songwriters
Black & Blue Records artists
Blues fiddlers
Charly Records artists
Country musicians from Louisiana
Country musicians from Texas
Deaths from lung cancer in Texas
Grammy Award winners
Guitarists from Louisiana
Guitarists from Texas
Musicians from San Antonio
People from Orange, Texas
People from Slidell, Louisiana
P-Vine Records artists
Singer-songwriters from Louisiana
Singer-songwriters from Texas
Swing drummers
Texas blues musicians
20th-century violists